This is a list of people from Argentina involved in sports or athletics.

Athletics

Short-distance running 
Juan Carlos Anderson
Tomás Beswick
Alberto Biedermann
Gerardo Bönnhoff
Federico Brewster
Otto Diesch
Guillermo Evans
Carlos Hofmeister
Guillermo Newberry
Juan Carlos Zabala

Long-distance running 
Delfo Cabrera
Griselda González
Reinaldo Gorno
Armando Sensini
Osvaldo Suárez
Eulalio Muñoz

Other fields 
Enrico Barney, pole vault
Luis Brunetto, triple jump
Juan Carlos Dyrzka, hurdling
Alejandra García, high jump
Juan Kahnert, shot put
Enrique Kistenmacher, decathlete 
Federico Kleger, hammer throw
Günther Kruse, discus throw
Estanislao Kocourek, hurdling
Ingeborg Pfüller, discus and shot put
Pablo Pietrobelli, javelin throw
Leonardo Price, middle-distance running
Noemí Simonetto, long jump
Tito Steiner, decathlete
Enrique Thompson, hurdling
Guillermo Weller, racewalking
Solange Witteveen, high jump

Basketball 
Facundo Campazzo, point guard
Carlos Delfino, small forward / shooting guard
Gabriel Fernández, power forward / center
Oscar Furlong, power forward / center
Manu Ginóbili, shooting guard
Leonardo Gutiérrez, power forward
Walter Herrmann, small forward
María Itatí Castaldi, Paralympian
Nicolás Laprovíttola, point guard
Alejandro Montecchia, point guard
Andrés Nocioni, small forward / power forward
Fabricio Oberto, center / power forward 
Pablo Prigioni, point guard
Juan Ignacio Sánchez, point guard
Luis Scola, power forward
Hugo Sconochini, shooting guard / small forward
Ezequiel Skverer, point guard
Joaquin Szuchman, shooting guard
Rubén Wolkowyski, center

Boxing 
 Carlos Baldomir
 Roberto Bolonti
 Ringo Bonavena
 Américo Bonetti
 Brian Castaño
 Miguel Ángel Castellini
 Jorge Castro
 Juan Martín Coggi
 Eduardo Corletti
 Carolina Duer, world champion
 Luis Firpo
 Víctor Galíndez
 José María Gatica
 José Giorgetti
 Nestor Hipolito Giovannini
 Mario Guilloti
 Santos Laciar
 Raúl Landini
 Jorge Miguel Maglioni
 Carlos Monzón
 Pascual Pérez
 Pedro Quartucci
 Cristian Rodríguez
 Marcos Sarfatti
 Carmelo Tomaselli

Cycling 
Jorge Bátiz
Juan Curuchet
Daniel Díaz
Darío Díaz
Sebastián Donadío
Juan Pablo Dotti
Ricardo Escuela
Juan Antonio Flecha
Jorge Gaday
Lucas Gaday
Jorge Giacinti
Emanuel Guevara
Juan José Haedo
Lucas Sebastián Haedo
Emiliano Ibarra
Daniel Juárez
Gabriel Juárez
Alfredo Lucero
Héctor Lucero
Matías Médici
Jorge Martín Montenegro
Luciano Montivero
Enzo Moyano
Mauricio Muller
Gonzalo Najar
Nicolás Naranjo
Walter Pérez
Jorge Pi
Rubén Ramos
Adrián Richeze
Mauro Richeze
Maximiliano Richeze
Roberto Richeze
Laureano Rosas
Eduardo Sepúlveda
Catriel Soto
Nicolás Tivani

Field hockey 
Magdalena Aicega
Luciana Aymar
Noel Barrionuevo
Soledad García
María de la Paz Hernández
Giselle Kañevsky
Mercedes Margalot
Karina Masotta
Joaquín Menini 
Vanina Oneto
Carla Rebecchi
Cecilia Rognoni
Lucas Rossi 
Belén Succi

Football

A

Gustavo Acosta
Sergio Agüero
Pablo Aimar
Nicolás Andereggen
Mariano Andújar
Osvaldo Ardiles
Jorge Aiello
Germán Alecha
Mariano Almandoz
Rodrigo Alonso
Juan Alvacete
Nicolás Amerise
Gustavo Antoun
Raúl Antuña
Ricky Aramendi
Ariel Aranda
Daniel Aráoz
Lautaro Arellano
Alberto Argañaraz
Andrés Ariaudo
Franco Armani
Julio César Armentia
Ezequiel Arriola
Jonathan Artura
Franco Ascencio
Fabián Assmann
Mauro Astrada
Carlos Dario Aurelio
Adrian Ávalos

B

Carlos Babington 
Tomás Badaloni 
Javier Baena
Héctor Baillié
Mateo Bajamich
Héctor Baley
Oscar Baquela
Ramón Bareiro
Osvaldo Barsottini
Miguel Ángel Basualdo
Alfio Basile, coach
Roberto Basílico
Roberto Bassaletti
Damián Batallini
Gabriel Batistuta
Sebastián Battaglia
Cristian Battocchio
Mariano Peralta Bauer
Julio Bayón
Pablo Becker
Patricio Bedrossian
Walter Behrens
José Bellingi
Enzo Benítez
Daniel Bertoni
Gonzalo Bettini
Luis Bevacqua
Adrián Bianchi
Carlos Bianchi, coach
Carlos Bilardo, coach
Agustín Bindella
Ricardo Bochini
John Bocwinski 
Gastón Bojanich
Mario Bolatti
Federico Bongioanni
Juan Manuel Bordaberry
Martín Bordonaro
Jonathan Bottinelli
Agustín Bouzat
Gonzalo Bozzoni
Daniel Brailovski, midfielder
Mauro Brandoni
Néstor Breitenbruch
Norberto Briasco
Claudio Brizuela
Rubén Norberto Bruno
José Luis Brown
Jorge Brown 
Andrés Bullentini
Roque Burella

C

Juan Pablo Cabaña
Maximiliano Cabaña
Juan Martín Cadelago
Esteban Cambiasso
Mauro Camoranessi
Cristian Campestrini
Daniel Cangialosi
Claudio Caniggia
Andres Cantor, announcer
Federico Capece
Walter Capozucchi
Denis Caputo
Luciano Cardenali
Daniel Carrara
Luis María Carregado
Vitor Castro de Souza
Lucas Castromán
Agustín Cattaneo
Leonardo Cauteruchi
Fernando Cavenaghi
Mariano Celasco
Paulo Centurión
Ezequiel Cerutti 
Daniel Alberto Chafer
Matías Chiacchio
Claudio Chena
Carlos Cinalli
Luciano Cipriani
Néstor Clausen
Javier Claut
Roberto Coll
Matías Coloca
Fabricio Coloccini
Gabriel Colombatti
Andrés Colombo
Juan Pablo Compagnucci
Enzo Copetti
Hugo Corbalán
Ezequiel Córdoba
Eduardo Cremasco
Hernán Crespo
Hector Cribioli
Emanuel Croce
Ernesto Cucchiaroni
Héctor Cúper, manager
Darío Cvitanich
Adrián Czornomaz

D–F

Alexis Danelón
Franco Del Giglio
Leonardo Delfino
Nicolás Demartini 
Juan Depetris
Jorge Detona
Faustino Dettler
Gustavo Dezotti
Néstor Di Luca
Ángel Di María
Alfredo Di Stéfano
Bruno Díaz
Alejandro Agustín Domenez
Alejandro Donatti
Rubén Dundo
Aldo Duscher
Paulo Dybala
Ezequiel Echeverría
Facundo Echevarría
Diego Erroz
Luis Alberto Escobedo
Raúl Espíndola
Néstor Espínola
Rodrigo Esmail
Julio César Falcioni
Federico Fattori
Gonzalo Favre
Tomás Federico
Darío Felman
Ivan Fergonzi
Gianluca Ferrari
Osvaldo Ferreño
Jonathan Figueira
Franco Figueroa
Esteban Figún
Rodolfo Fischer
Walter Fonseca
Victoriano Frágola
Andrés Franzoia
Alejandro Frezzotti
Julio Furch

G–I

Adrián Gabbarini
Adolfo Gaich
Marcelo Galeazzi
Luciano Galletti
Pedro Alfredo Gallina
Giuliano Galoppo
Gabriel Gandarillas
José Eulogio Gárate
Juan Ezequiel García
Roberto Gargini
Juan Gargiulo
Juan Garibaldi
Héctor Gustavo Gatti
Hugo Gatti
Federico Gattoni
Ezequiel Gaviglio
Alejo Gelatini
Gastón Gerzel
Lautaro Gianetti
Fernando Giarrizo
Emmanuel Gigliotti
Federico Girotti
Eliseo Giusfredi
Claus Gold Betig
Paolo Goltz
Alcides González
Aníbal Roy González
Carlos Alcides González
Claudio Daniel González
Nicolás Gorobsov
Franco Gorzelewski
Pablo Gozzarelli
Javier Grandoli
Damián Grosso
Oscar Gualdoni
Manuel Guanini
Matías Guardia
Jonathan Guerazar
Brian Guerra
Luciano Guiñazú
Ezequiel Ham
Agustín Hausch
Juan Enrique Hayes
Hernán Hechalar
Gabriel Heinze
Emanuel Hermida
Diego Herner
René Houseman
Eduardo Iachetti
Mauro Icardi
Jonathan Ivanoff

J–L

Lucas Janson
Luis Kadijevic
Enzo Kalinski
Walter Kannemann
Mario Kempes
Daniel Killer
Diego Klimowicz
Uriel Ramírez Kloster
Gonzalo Klusener
Juan Komar
Maximiliano Luayza Koot
Matías Kranevitter
Juan Pablo Krilanovich
Facundo Kruspzky
Lucas Kruspzky
Leandro Lacunza
Luis Lagrutta
Erik Lamela
Ricardo Lazbal
Franco Lefiñir
Darío Leguiza
Christian Leichner
Matías Leichner
Federico León
Mateo Levato
Lucas Licht
Vicente Locaso
Nicolás López Macri
Augusto Lotti
Cristian Lucchetti
Martín Lucero
Abel Luciatti
Leonardo Luppino
Germán Lux

M

Alexis Mac Allister
Carlos Mac Allister
Imanol Machuca
Ariel Macia
Carlos Madeo
Nicolás Magno
Julián Malatini
Edgardo Maldonado
José Luis Mamone
Alejandro Mancuso
Ariel Mangiantini
César Mansanelli
Diego Maradona
Claudio Marangoni
Hector Leonardo Marinaro
Gonzalo Marinelli
Favio Márquez
Gerardo Martino
Gastón Martiré
Juan Marvezzi
Silvio Marzolini
Javier Mascherano
Carlos Matheu
Juan Manuel Mazzocchi
Agustín Mazzola
Maximiliano Medina
Andrés Mehring
Claudio Mele
Matías Melluso
Waldemar Méndez
Lucas Menossi
César Luis Menotti, coach
Lionel Messi
Martín Minadevino
Gastón Minutillo
Braian Miranda
Federico Mociulsky
Lucas Modesto
Antonio Mohamed
Diego Mondino
Fernando Monetti
Lautaro Montoya
Nehuen Montoya
Dimas Morales
Matías Morales
Nicolás Morgantini
Claudio Morresi
Leonel Mosevich
Agustín Mulet
Juan Carlos Muñoz
Julio Musimessi
Juan Musso

N–P

Santiago Nagüel
Diego Nakache
Juan Manuel Navarrete
José Miguel Noguera
Francisco Nouet
Thiago Nuss
Agustín Occhiato
Rodolfo Orlandini
Luca Orozco
Patricio Ostachuk
Valentín Otondo
Gastón Otreras
Alejandro Pajurek
Martín Palermo
Leandro Paredes
Damián París
Mariano Pasini
Fernando Paternoster
Diego Pave
Miguel Ángel Pecoraro
Emiliano Pedreira
Alfredo Peel
José Pékerman, coach
Mauricio Pellegrino
Leonel Peralta
Ariel Gustavo Pereyra
Natalio Perinetti
Diego Perotti
Ignacio Piatti
Pablo Piatti
Santiago Pierotti
Maximiliano Pighin
Axel Pinto
Hector Pizorno
Mauricio Pochettino
Tomás Pochettino
Luciano Pocrnjic
René Pontoni
Facundo Ponzio
Sebastián Prediger
Matías Presentado
Vicente Principiano
Ijiel Protti
Héctor Pueblas

Q–R

Ives Fabián Quintana
Marcos Daniel Quiroga
Marcos Esteban Quiroga
Sergio Quiroga
Gastón Rapolo
Federico Rasmussen
Franco Razzotti
Germán Real
Federico Recalde
Tobías Reinhart
Ariel Reyes
Emiliano Rigoni
Nicolás Rinaldi
Juan Román Riquelme
Enzo Ritacco
Claudio Rivadero
Ricardo Rodríguez Marengo
Maximiliano Rogoski
Benjamín Rollheiser
Esteban Rolón
Santiago Rosa
Martín Rose
Agustín Rossi
Néstor Rossi
Oscar Rossi
Matías Rotondi

S

Mario Saccone
Emiliano Sala
Hernán Salazar
Rodrigo Salomón
Walter Samuel
José Sand
Nicolás Sansotre
Marcos Luciano Sartor Camiña
Javier Saviola
Lionel Scaloni
Darío Scatolaro
Mauro Scatularo
Rodrigo Schlegel
Ignacio Schor
Augusto Schott
Gabriel Schürrer
Lucas Seimandi
Javier Sequeyra
Darío Siviski
Christian Smigiel
Javier Sodero
Leandro Soria
Juan Pablo Sorín
Mariano Sorrentino
Raúl Speroni
Renzo Spinaci
Claudio Spinelli
Ivar Stafuza
Emiliano Strappini
Guillermo Szeszurak

T–V

Cristián Taborda
Guillermo Tambussi
Alberto Tarantini
Nicolás Tauber
Enzo Tejada
Roberto Telch
Carlos Tevez
Nicolás Thaller
Marcelo Tinari
Pablo Torresagasti
Christian Trapasso
Jorge Trezeguet
Jonathan Tridente
Marcelo Trobbiani
Franco Troyansky
Gonzalo Ucha
Matías Vaccaneo
Franco Vaccaro
 Nicolás Valansi 
Diego Valeri
Jonatan Nahuel Valle
José Van Tuyne
Leonel Vangioni
José Varacka
Bernardo Vargas
Mattias Vegnaduzzo
Cristian Vella
Santiago Vergini
Juan Sebastián Verón
Lucas Vesco
Marcelo Vidal
Hernán Villalba
Miguel Ángel Villamonte
Guido Villar
José Luis Villarreal
Ezequiel Viola

W–Z

Nicolás Watson
Marcelo Weigandt
Luis Weihmuller
Aarón Wergifker
Axel Werner
Lucas Daniel Wilchez
Daniel Willington
Enrique Wolff
Claudio Yacob
Damián Yáñez
Emanuel Zagert
Facundo Zamarián
Javier Zanetti
Mario Zaninovic
Carlos Zaragoza
Cristian Zarco
Leonardo Zarosa
Lucas Zelarayán
Ricardo Zielinski
Franco Zuculini

Golf 

 Ángel Cabrera
 José Cóceres
 Roberto De Vicenzo
 Estanislao Goya
 Andrés Romero
 Eduardo Romero

Marine sports 
Serena Amato, sailing
Tranquilo Cappozzo, rowing
Cecilia Carranza Saroli, sailing
Vito Dumas, yachting
Carlos Espínola, sailing
Germán Frers, yachting
Eduardo Guerrero, rowing
Emilio Homps, sailing
Santiago Lange, sailing

Martial arts 
Guido Cannetti, mixed martial arts
Sebastián Crismanich, taekwondo
Daniela Krukower, world champion judo
Paula Pareto, judo
Rubén Peucelle, wrestling and bodybuilding
Santiago Ponzinibbio, mixed martial arts
Laureano Staropoli, mixed martial arts

Motorsports 
Juan Manuel Fangio, car driver
Oscar Gálvez, race car driver
Esteban Guerrieri, race car driver
Eric Lichtenstein, race car driver
José María López, race car driver
Enrique Mansilla, racing driver
Carlos Reutemann, car driver and politician

Polo 
 Mariano Aguerre
 Adolfo Cambiaso
 Bartolomé Castagnola
 Andrés Gazzotti
 Lucas Monteverde
 Facundo Pieres

Rugby 
Felipe Contepomi, rugby union player
Ignacio Corleto, rugby player
Agustín Creevy, rugby union player
Juan Martín Fernández Lobbe, rugby union player
Juan Martín Hernández, rugby union player
Juan Imhoff, rugby union player
Mario Ledesma, rugby player
José María Núñez Piossek, rugby player
Luciano Orquera, rugby player
Ramiro Pez, rugbier
Agustín Pichot, rugby union player
Hugo Porta, rugby union player
Rodrigo Roncero, rugby union player
Nicolás Sánchez, rugby union player
Joaquín Tuculet, rugby union player

Swimming 
 Georgina Bardach
 Damián Blaum
 Jeannette Campbell
 Federico Grabich
 José Meolans
 Alberto Zorrilla

Tennis 
José Acasuso
Juan Pablo Brzezicki
Agustín Calleri
Guillermo Cañas
José Luis Clerc
Guillermo Coria
Brian Dabul
Juan Martín del Potro
Gisela Dulko
Jonathan Erlich
Gastón Etlis
Clarisa Fernández
Gastón Gaudio
Inés Gorrochategui
Diego Hartfield 
Mariano Hood 
Martín Jaite
Leonardo Mayer
Juan Mónaco
David Nalbandián
Mercedes María Paz
Mariano Puerta
Sergio Roitman
Gabriela Sabatini
María Emilia Salerni
Diego Schwartzman
Paola Suárez
Patricia Tarabini
Guillermo Vilas

Volleyball 
Daniel Castellani
Facundo Conte
Hugo Conte
Juan Cuminetti
Luciano De Cecco
Sabrina Soledad Germanier
Waldo Kantor
Esteban Martínez
Marcos Milinkovic
Raúl Quiroga
Sebastián Solé
Alejandro Spajic
Jon Uriarte
Julio Velasco, coach
Javier Weber

Miscellaneous 
 Julio Alfredo Chiappero, chess
 Sebastien Dechamps, handball
 Carlos Enrique Díaz Sáenz Valiente, shooter
 Donald Forrester, cricket 
 Martín Gramática, American football player
 Lucas Legnani, bowler
 Denis Margalik, figure skater
 Carlos Moratorio, equestrian
 Oscar Panno, chess grandmaster
 Humberto Selvetti, weightlifting
 Diego Simonet, handball
 Pablo Tabachnik, table tennis
 Martin Vari, kitesurfing

See also

 List of Argentines
 List of flag bearers for Argentina at the Olympics

References

Sportspeople
 
Argentine
List